The brown-crowned scimitar babbler (Pomatorhinus phayrei) is a species of bird in the family Timaliidae.
It is found in Bhutan, India, Myanmar, Thailand, Laos, Vietnam, and China. Its natural habitat is subtropical moist montane forest.

References

Pomatorhinus
Birds of Bhutan
Birds of India
Birds of Myanmar
Birds of Thailand
Birds described in 1847
Taxa named by Edward Blyth